Azaari Mohamed Zain (born 11 December 1952) is a Malaysian field hockey player. He competed in the men's tournament at the 1976 Summer Olympics.

References

External links
 

1952 births
Living people
Malaysian male field hockey players
Olympic field hockey players of Malaysia
Field hockey players at the 1976 Summer Olympics
Place of birth missing (living people)
Asian Games medalists in field hockey
Asian Games bronze medalists for Malaysia
Medalists at the 1974 Asian Games
Medalists at the 1978 Asian Games
Field hockey players at the 1974 Asian Games
Field hockey players at the 1978 Asian Games